Larry Mahaney Diamond is a baseball stadium in Orono, Maine, located on the campus of the University of Maine. It is the home of the  team. Its capacity is 4,400 spectators. It opened in the early 1980s.

Usage
From 1996 to 1997, the field was the home of the Bangor Blue Ox of the independent Northeast League.

In 2003, the venue was the home of the Bangor Lumberjacks, also of the Northeast League. Following the 2003 season, the team moved to the Winkin Sports Complex on the campus of Husson College in Bangor, Maine.

In 1991, Mahaney Diamond hosted the NCAA Northeast Regional.  The field has also hosted two ECAC Tournaments, in 1990 and 1991.  It has hosted three America East Conference baseball tournaments, in 1993, 2002, and 2004.  In 2002, Maine won the tournament on its home field.

Naming
The field is named for Larry Mahaney, an area businessman and philanthropist who graduated from the university in 1951.  His donations allowed for several renovations to the park.  Mahaney died in 2006.

See also
 List of NCAA Division I baseball venues

References

External links 
 Mahaney Diamond

Baseball venues in Maine
Maine Black Bears baseball
College baseball venues in the United States
Minor league baseball venues
Buildings and structures in Orono, Maine
Tourist attractions in Penobscot County, Maine
Buildings and structures at the University of Maine
Sports venues in Penobscot County, Maine